Tyler Smith may refer to:

Tyler Smith (American football) (born 2001), American football player
Tyler Smith (baseball) (born 1991), American baseball player
Tyler Smith (basketball) (born 1986), American basketball player
Tyler Smith (footballer) (born 1998), English footballer
Tyler Smith (musician) (born 1986), American musician
Tyler Smith (politician) (born 1990), American politician
Tyler Smith (Neighbours), character on the Australian soap opera Neighbours